The 2003 WTA Tour was the elite professional tennis circuit organized by the Women's Tennis Association (WTA) for the 2003 tennis season. The 2003 WTA Tour included the four Grand Slam tournaments, the WTA Tour Championships and the WTA Tier I, Tier II, Tier III, Tier IV and Tier V events. ITF tournaments were not part of the 2003 WTA Tour, although they award points for the WTA World Ranking.

Schedule 
The table below shows the 2003 WTA Tour schedule.

Key

January

February

March

April

May

June

July

August

September

October

November

Rankings 
Below are the 2003 WTA year-end rankings:

Number 1 ranking

Statistics 
List of players and titles won, last name alphabetically:
  Kim Clijsters – Sydney, Indian Wells, Rome, 's-Hertogenbosch, Stanford, Los Angeles, Filderstadt, Luxembourg and WTA Tour Championships (9)
  Justine Henin-Hardenne – Dubai, Charleston, Berlin, French Open, San Diego, Toronto, U.S. Open and Zurich (8)
  Anastasia Myskina – Doha, Sarasota, Leipzig and Moscow (4)
  Serena Williams – Australian Open, Paris, Miami and Wimbledon (4)
  Elena Dementieva – Amelia Island, Bali and Shanghai (3)
  Amélie Mauresmo – Warsaw and Philadelphia (2)
  Chanda Rubin – Madrid and Eastbourne (2)
  Magüi Serna – Estoril and Budapest (2)
  Maria Sharapova – Tokyo Japan Open and Quebec City (2)
  Anna Pistolesi – Sopot and Helsinki (2)
  Ai Sugiyama – Scottsdale and Linz (2)
  Jennifer Capriati – New Haven (1)
  Amanda Coetzer – Acapulco (1)
  Eleni Daniilidou – Auckland (1)
  Lindsay Davenport – Tokyo Pan Pacific (1)
  Nathalie Dechy – Gold Coast (1)
  Silvia Farina Elia – Strasbourg (1)
  Rita Grande – Casablanca (1)
  Magdalena Maleeva – Birmingham (1)
  Alicia Molik – Hobart (1)
  Henrieta Nagyová – Pattaya City (1)
  Lisa Raymond – Memphis (1)
  Virginia Ruano Pascual – Tashkent (1)
  Dinara Safina – Palermo (1)
  Meghann Shaughnessy – Canberra (1)
  Paola Suárez – Vienna (1)
  Tamarine Tanasugarn – Hyderabad (1)
  Venus Williams – Antwerp (1)
  Fabiola Zuluaga – Bogotá (1)
  Vera Zvonareva – Bol (1)

The following players won their first title:
  Nathalie Dechy – Gold Coast
  Alicia Molik – Hobart
  Tamarine Tanasugarn – Hyderabad
  Elena Dementieva – Amelia Island
  Vera Zvonareva – Bol
  Maria Sharapova – Tokyo Japan Open

Titles won by nation:
  – 17 (Sydney, Dubai, Indian Wells, Charleston, Berlin, Rome, French Open, 's-Hertogenbosch, Stanford, San Diego, Los Angeles, Toronto, U.S. Open, Filderstadt, Zurich, Luxembourg and WTA Tour Championships)
  – 11 (Doha, Sarasota, Amelia Island, Bol, Palermo, Bali, Shanghai, Leipzig, Moscow, Tokyo Japan Open and Quebec City)
  – 11 (Canberra, Australian Open, Tokyo Pan Pacific, Paris, Antwerp, Memphis, Miami, Madrid, Eastbourne, Wimbledon and New Haven)
  – 3 (Gold Coast, Warsaw and Philadelphia)
  – 3 (Estoril, Budapest and Tashkent)
  – 2 (Sopot and Helsinki)
  – 2 (Casablanca and Strasbourg)
  – 2 (Scottsdale and Linz)
  – 1 (Vienna)
  – 1 (Hobart)
  – 1 (Birmingham)
  – 1 (Bogotá)
  – 1 (Auckland)
  – 1 (Acapulco)
  – 1 (Pattaya City)
  – 1 (Hyderabad)

See also 
 2003 ATP Tour
 WTA Tour
 List of female tennis players
 List of tennis tournaments

External links 
 Women's Tennis Association (WTA) official website

 
WTA Tour
WTA Tour seasons